Gayéri is a department or commune of Komondjari Province in Burkina Faso.

Towns 
The department consists of a chief town :

 Gayéri

and 24 villages:

 Bandikidini
 Bassiéri
 Boalla
 Bouogou
 Carimama
 Diabatou

 Djora
 Gamboudéni
 Gnifoagma
 Komompouma
 Kopialga
 Kotougou

 Kourgou
 Lonadéni
 Louanga
 Maldiabari
 Maldianga
 Nalidougou

 N'Bina
 Yeah
 Soualimou
 Tiargou
 Tiboudi
 Toumbenga.

References 

Departments of Burkina Faso
Komondjari Province